State Route 319 (SR 319) is a state highway in southeast Tennessee, starting at the intersection of SR 153 in Chattanooga, traveling to the area of Soddy-Daisy where it intersects with US 27, and the route comes to an end.

Route description
SR 319 begins on the northeast side of Chattanooga at SR 153 and SR 58. SR 319 has a short 1.8 mile concurrency/overlap with SR 58, to where SR 58 heads southwest and SR 319 turns north to have an interchange with Access Road and Hixson Pike after this intersection it enters Chattanooga's Hixson neighborhood. SR 319 then turns east and Junctions with SR 153 and turns north back along SR 153 and begins a very short 0.7 mile-long concurrency to an interchange where SR 153 heads northwest and SR 319 turns northeast and leaves Chattanooga/Hixson 3.7 miles from SR 153. It then enters the community of Middle Valley and then after 3.3 miles it leaves Middle Valley corporate limits and enters the city of Lakesite and in this area it turns back and forth from east to north. After it leaves Lakesite it passes the Sequoyah Nuclear Plant and turns northwest and enters Soddy-Daisy city limits to end at US 27/SR 29.

Junction list

References

Transportation in Hamilton County, Tennessee
319
Transportation in Chattanooga, Tennessee